This is a list of typefaces, which are separated into groups by distinct artistic differences. The list includes typefaces that have articles or that are referenced. Superfamilies that fall under more than one category have an asterisk (*) after their name.

Serif

Adobe Jenson
Albertus
Aldus
Alexandria
Algerian
Amelia (Designed in 1963 by Stan Davis)
American Typewriter
Antiqua
Arno*
Aster
Aurora
News 706
Baskerville
Bell (Didone classification serif type designed by Richard Austin, 1788)
Belwe Roman
Bembo
Bernhard Modern
Bodoni
Bauer Bodoni
Bitstream Charter
Bookman
Bulmer
Caledonia
Calisto MT
Cambria
Capitals
Cartier
Caslon
Wyld
Caslon Antique / Fifteenth Century
Centaur
Century type family
Charis SIL
Cheltenham
Clearface
Cloister Black
Cochin
Computer Modern
Concrete Roman
Constantia
Copperplate Gothic
DejaVu Serif
Didot
Droid Serif
Emerson
Fairfield
Fat face
FF Scala
Fixedsys
Footlight
Friz Quadrata
Garamond
Gentium
Georgia
GNU FreeFont
Google logo
Goudy Old Style / Goudy
Granjon
Hermann Zapf
Hightower Text
Hoefler Text
IBM Plex Serif*
Imprint
ITC Benguiat
Janson
Jokerman
Joanna
Korinna
Legibility Group
Lexicon
Liberation Serif
Linux Libertine
Literaturnaya
Lucida Bright*
Ludwig & Mayer
Memphis
Miller
Minion*
Modern
Mrs Eaves*
MS Serif
Nebiolo Printech
Torino
New York (one of the original Macintosh system fonts)
Nimbus Roman No. 9 L
NPS Rawlinson Roadway
OCR-A
Palatino
Book Antiqua
Sistina
Perpetua
Plantin
PT Fonts
Renault
Requiem
Rotis*
Rudolph Ruzicka
Sabon
Source Serif
Souvenir
Stephenson Blake
STIX Fonts project (see also XITS font project)
Sylfaen
Theano Didot
Times New Roman
Times (Linotype's version of Times New Roman)
Trajan
Trinité
Trump Mediaeval
University of California Old Style
Berkeley Old Style
Californian FB
Utopia
Vera Serif
Windsor
XITS font project

Slab serif

Alexandria
American Typewriter
Archer
Athens
Candida
Cholla Slab
City
Clarendon
Concrete Roman
Courier
Egyptienne
Guardian Egyptian
Legibility Group
Ionic No. 5
Lexia
Memphis
Nilland
Roboto Slab
Rockwell
Schadow
Serifa
Skeleton Antique
Tower

Sans-serif

Agency FB
Akzidenz-Grotesk
Andalé Sans
Antique Olive
Arial
Arial Unicode MS
Avant Garde Gothic
Avenir
Bank Gothic
Bauhaus
Bell Centennial
Bell Gothic
Benguiat Gothic
Berlin Sans
Brandon Grotesque
Calibri
Casey
Century Gothic*
Charcoal (Mac OS 9 system font)
Chicago (pre-Mac OS 8 system font, still included with macOS)
Clearview
Comic Sans
Compacta
Corbel
DejaVu Sans
DIN
Dotum
Droid Sans
Dyslexie (designed to mitigate some of the issues that dyslexics experience when reading)
Ecofont
Eras
Esseltub
Espy Sans
Eurocrat
Eurostile
Square 721
FF Dax
FF Meta*
FF Scala Sans
Fira Sans
Fira Mono
Fira Code
Fira Go
Folio
Franklin Gothic*
FreeSans
Frutiger
Futura
Geneva (one of the original Macintosh system fonts)
Gill Sans*
Gill Sans Schoolbook
Gotham*
Haettenschweiler
Handel Gothic
Hei
Helvetica
Helvetica Neue
Swiss 721
Highway Gothic
IBM Plex Sans*
Impact
Industria
Interstate
Johnston/New Johnston
Kabel
Klavika
Lato
Liberation Sans
Linux Biolinum
Lucida Sans*
Lucida Grande*
Lucida Sans Unicode*
Lydian
Meiryo
Meta
Microgramma
Modern (vector font included with Windows 2.1)
Motorway (used on British motorway signs for route numbers)
MS Sans Serif (included with all Microsoft Windows versions, superseded by Arial)
Myriad*
Neutraface
Neuzeit S
News Gothic
Nimbus Sans L
Nordstern
Open Sans
Optima
Overpass
Parisine (used by the RATP Group on their jurisdictions of Paris's transit system)
Product Sans
Proxima Nova
PT Sans (made for all minority languages of Russian Federation)
Rail Alphabet
Roboto
Rotis Sans
 San Francisco (sans-serif typeface) (default typeface in iOS 9 and above and OS X El Capitan and above)
Segoe UI
Skia (the first QuickDraw GX font, still found in macOS today)
Source Sans Pro
SST*
Sweden Sans
Syntax
System (Windows 3.x default)
Tahoma
Template Gothic
Thesis Sans*
Tiresias
Trade Gothic
Transport (used on British road signs)
Trebuchet MS
Twentieth Century (Tw Cen MT)
Ubuntu
Unica
Univers
Zurich
Vera Sans
Verdana

Semi-serif
 Nyala
 Rotis Semi Serif
 EasyReading

Monospace

Andalé Mono
Arial Monospaced
Bitstream Vera (Vera Sans Mono)
Consolas
Courier
Courier New
Cutive Mono
DejaVu Sans Mono
Droid Sans Mono
Everson Mono (also known as Everson Mono Unicode)
Fira Mono
Fira Code
Fixed
Fixedsys
HyperFont
IBM Plex Mono*
Inconsolata
Letter Gothic
Liberation Mono
Lucida Console*
Lucida Sans Typewriter*
Lucida Typewriter*
Menlo
MICR (Magnetic Ink Character Recognition, several fonts)
Monaco (one of the original Macintosh system fonts)
Monospace
MS Gothic
MS Mincho
Nimbus Mono L
OCR-A (Optical Character Recognition)
OCR-B
PragmataPro
Prestige Elite (also known as Prestige, is similar to Courier)
ProFont (a freeware font designed for easy readability at small sizes)
Proggy programming fonts
Roboto Mono
SimHei
SST Typewriter
SimSun
Source Code Pro
Terminal
Ubuntu Mono
Vera Sans Mono (Bitstream Vera)

Script

Brush scripts

Balloon
Brush Script
Choc
Dom Casual
Mistral
Papyrus
Segoe Script
Utopia

Calligraphic

American Scribe
AMS Euler
Apple Chancery
Forte
French Script
ITC Zapf Chancery
Kuenstler Script
Monotype Corsiva
Old English Text MT
Zapfino

Handwriting 

Andy
Ashley Script
Cézanne
Chalkboard
Comic Sans MS
Comic Neue
Dom Casual
Freestyle Script
Kristen
Lucida Handwriting

Other script 

Coronet
Curlz
Gravura
Script (vector font included with Windows 2.1)
Wiesbaden Swing

Blackletter

Bastard
Breitkopf Fraktur
Fette Fraktur (Fraktur Bold)
Fletcher
Fraktur
Lucida Blackletter
Old English Text
Schwabacher
Tannenberg
 Textualis (Textura)
Theuerdank Fraktur

Non-Latin

 Aharoni (including Hebrew script)
 Aldhabi calligraphic Arabic font by Microsoft.
 Aisha (Arabic, Latin)
 Aparajita (Angika, Bhojpuri, Bodo and other Indian languages)
 Arek (Armenian, Latin)
 Arial (Used in English, Arabic, Hebrew and other languages)
 Avory (Cyrillic, Greek, Latin)
 Awami Nastaliq features a more extensive character set than most Nastaliq typefaces, supporting:  Urdu, Balochi, Farsi (Iranian Persian), Khowar, Palula, Saraiki, Shina. available from SIL website
 Baloo (OFL typeface set for Indian languages)
 Baloo for Devanagari (Hindi and other north Indian languages)
 Baloo Bhai for Gujarati
 Baloo Bhaijaan for Urdu 
 Baloo Bhaina for Oriya
 Baloo Chettan for Malayalam
 Baloo Da for Bengali
 Baloo Paaji for Gurumukhi
 Baloo Tamma for Kannada
 Baloo Tammudu for Telugu
 Baloo Thambi for Tamil
 Calibri (Greek)
 Chandas (Devanagari)
 Clone (Cyrillic, Greek, Latin)
 Corsair (Cyrillic, Greek, Latin)
 Eskorte (Arabic, Latin)
 Gadugi (Used by the American/Canadian Blackfoot tribe, and for the language called Carrier, and used by the Native American tribe of the Cherokee and for other languages)
 Grecs du roi (Greek)
 Hanacaraka (traditional Javanese script)
 Japanese Gothic
 Jomolhari (Tibetan script)
 Kiran (Devanagari)
 Kochi
 Koren (Hebrew)
 Kruti Dev (Devanagari)
 Malgun Gothic (Korean sans-serif)
 Meiryo (Japanese sans-serif gothic typeface)
 Microsoft JhengHei (Traditional Chinese)
 Microsoft YaHei (Simplified Chinese)
 Minchō
 Ming
 Mona (Japanese)
 MS Gothic
 Nassim (Arabic, Latin)
 Nastaliq Navees
 Neacademia (Cyrillic, Latin)
 Noto Sans 
 Noto Serif
 Perpetua Greek
 Porson (Greek)
 Segoe UI Symbol (Latin, Braille, Coptic and Gothic)
 Shruti (Gujarati)
 Skolar (a multi-script font family with Arabic, Cyrillic, Devanagari, Greek, Gujarati and Latin scripts)
 Skolar Sans (in Arabic, Cyrillic, Greek, Latin)
 SimSun
 Sylfaen (a multi-script serif font family, for various non-Latin scripts and is for the languages Armenian and Georgian)
 Sutturah (Cyrillic, Latin)
 Tahoma has a very extensive character set including: 
 Latin (extended including: "Latin 2" for eastern Europe, Turkish, and Vietnamese)
 Arabic (extended character set covering Urdu, Pashto, Kurdish, and others)
 and other alphabets: Cyrillic, Greek, Hebrew, and Thai.
 Tengwar
 Tibetan Machine Uni
 Urdu Typesetting is designed for Urdu. The character set covers other languages (such as Arabic and Persian) but the Nastaliq style is unusual for modern documents in languages other than Urdu.
 Wilson Greek

Unicode fonts

This list of more comprehensive Unicode fonts, including open-source Unicode typefaces, showing the number of characters/glyphs included for the released version, and also showing font's license type:

 Alphabetum (shareware, includes a few SMP character blocks. Over 5,490 characters in version 9.00)
 Arial Unicode MS (distributed along with Microsoft Office (2002XP, 2003). only supports up to Unicode 2.0. Contains 50,377 glyphs (38,917 characters) in v1.01.)
 Batang and Gungsuh, a serif and monospace/gothic font, respectively; both with 20,609 Latin/Cyrillic/CJK glyphs in version 2.11. Distributed with Microsoft Office.
 Bitstream Cyberbit (free for non-commercial use. 29,934 glyphs in v2.0-beta.)
 Bitstream Vera (free/open source, limited coverage with 300 glyphs, DejaVu fonts extend Bitstream Vera with thousands of glyphs)
 Charis SIL (free/open source, over 4,600 glyphs in v4.114)
 Code2000 (shareware Unicode font; supports the entire BMP. 63,888 glyphs in v1.15. Abandoned.)
 Code2001 (freeware; supports the SMP. 2,944 glyphs in v0.917. Abandoned.)
 Code2002
 DejaVu fonts (free/open source, "DejaVu Sans" includes 3,471 glyphs and 2,558 kerning pairs in v2.6)
 Doulos SIL (free/open source, designed for IPA, 3,083 glyphs in v4.014.)
 EB Garamond (free/open source, includes 3,218 glyphs in 2017)
 Everson Mono (also known as, Everson Mono Unicode. Shareware; contains all non-CJK characters. 4,899 glyphs in Macromedia Fontographer v4.1.3 2003-02-13.)
 Fallback font (freeware fallback font for Windows)
 Free UCS Outline Fonts aka FreeFont (free/open source, "FreeSerif" includes 3,914 glyphs in v1.52, MES-1 compliant)
 Gentium (free/open source, "Gentium Plus" includes over 5,500 glyphs in November 2010)
 GNU Unifont (free/open source, bitmapped glyphs are inclusive as defined in unicode-5.1 only)
 Georgia Ref (also distributed under the name "MS Reference Serif," extension of the Georgia typeface)
 Gulim/New Gulim and Dotum, rounded sans-serif and non-rounded sans-serif respectively, (distributed with Microsoft Office 2000. wide range of CJK (Korean) characters. 49,284 glyphs in v3.10.)
 Junicode (free; includes many obsolete scripts, intended for mediævalists. 2,235 glyphs in v0.6.12.)
 Kurinto Font Folio (open source (OFL), pan-Unicode, 21 typefaces, 506 fonts; v2.196 (July 26, 2020) has coverage of most of Unicode v12.1 plus many auxiliary scripts including the UCSUR)
 LastResort (fallback font covering all 17 Unicode planes, included with Mac OS 8.5 and up)
 Lucida Grande (Unicode font included with macOS; includes 1,266 glyphs)*
 Lucida Sans Unicode (included in more recent Microsoft Windows versions; only supports ISO 8859-x characters. 1,776 glyphs in v2.00.)*
 MS Gothic (distributed with Microsoft Office, 14,965 glyphs in v2.30)
 MS Mincho (distributed with Microsoft Office, 14,965 glyphs in v2.30)
 Nimbus Sans Global
 Noto, a family of fonts designed by Google: nearly 64,000 glyphs as of 2018.
 PragmataPro, a modular monospaced font family designed by Fabrizio Schiavi, Regular version includes more than 7000 glyphs
 Squarish Sans CT  v0.10 (1,756 glyphs; Latin, Greek, Cyrillic, Hebrew, and more)
 STIX (especially mathematics, symbols and Greek, see also XITS)
 Titus Cyberbit Basic (free; updated version of Cyberbit. 9,779 glyphs in v3.0, 2000.)
 Verdana Ref (also distributed under the name "MS Reference Sans Serif," extension of the Verdana typeface)
 XITS (especially mathematics, symbols and Greek)

Dingbat/Symbol fonts

Apple Symbols (Included with macOS)
Asana-Math
Blackboard bold
Bookshelf Symbol 7
Cambria Math
Computer Modern
Lucida Math*
Marlett
Symbol (consists of Greek letters and mathematical symbols)
Webdings
Wingdings
Wingdings 2
Wingdings 3
Zapf Dingbats

Display/Decorative fonts

Ad Lib
Allegro
Andreas
Arnold Böcklin
Astur
Banco
Bauhaus
Braggadocio
Broadway
Caslon Antique
Cooper Black
Curlz
Ellington
Exocet
FIG Script
Forte
Gabriola
Horizon
Jim Crow
Lo-Type
Neuland
Peignot
San Francisco
Stencil
Umbra
Westminster
Willow
Windsor

Ethnic fonts

Lithos (Greek)
Höfðaletur (Icelandic)

Miscellaneous
 Compatil
 Generis
 Grasset
 LED
 Luxi
 Sans forgetica (learning aid font)

Typefaces with an asterisk(*) after their name are part of a superfamily that belongs to multiple categories.

See also
 Adobe Originals
 Computer font
 Font family (HTML)
 Font management software
 Gaelic type
 List of Apple typefaces
 List of typefaces included with Microsoft Windows
 List of public signage typefaces
 List of typefaces designed by Frederic Goudy
 List of typefaces included with macOS
 Record type
 Vox-ATypI classification

References